The 24th Infantry Division "Pinerolo" was an infantry division of the Royal Italian Army during World War II. The division was based in Chieti, with its regiments in the Abruzzo region. The division was named for the city of Pinerolo. The division's regimental depots were shared with the 62nd Infantry Division "Marmarica", which was based in Derna in Libya and recruited its men from and trained them in Abruzzo.

History 
The division's lineage begins with the Brigade "Pinerolo" established on 21 December 1821, which on 19 December 1831 split to form the 1st and 2nd infantry regiments under the brigade's command. On 4 May 1839 the two regiments were re-numbered as 13th Regiment Brigade "Pinerolo" and 14th Regiment Brigade "Pinerolo".

World War I 
The brigade fought on the Italian front in World War I. On 10 November 1926 the brigade assumed the name of XXIV Infantry Brigade and received the 225th Infantry Regiment "Arezzo" from the disbanded Brigade "Arezzo". The brigade was the infantry component of the 24th Territorial Division of Chieti, which also included the 18th Artillery Regiment. In 1934 the division changed its name to 24th Infantry Division "Gran Sasso".

Second Italo-Ethiopian War 
The division participated in the Second Italo-Ethiopian War, where it operated in the Tigray Region and fought in the Battle of Shire. After the war the division returned to Italy. On 1 March 1937 the 225th Infantry Regiment "Arezzo" was transferred to the 63rd Infantry Division "Cirene" in Libya. On 1 March 1938 the 225th Infantry Regiment "Arezzo" was renamed 158th Infantry Regiment "Liguria" and on the same day the 225th Infantry Regiment "Arezzo" was raised anew in Ascoli Piceno.

On 24 May 1939 the division ceded 225th Infantry Regiment "Arezzo" to the newly activated 53rd Infantry Division "Arezzo". On the same day the XXIV Infantry Brigade was dissolved, with the two remaining infantry regiments coming under direct command of the division, and the 18th Artillery Regiment was given the name "Pinerolo".

World War II 
During the Italian invasion of France in June 1940 the division was the reserve of I Army Corps and remained in the area Moncenisio and Bardonecchia.

Greco-Italian War 
In January 1941 the division was sent to Albania to reinforce the crumbling Italian front during the Greek offensive in the Greco-Italian War. On 18 January 1941 the division was in Berat and entered the front near Këlcyrë. The division fought defensive battles for the next month ending with the defense of Tepelenë. From 9 March 1941 the division participated in the Italian Spring Offensive and advanced after strenuous combat to Çarshovë on the Greek-Albanian border.

On 6 April the Axis Invasion of Yugoslavia commenced and on 8 April 1941 the Pinerolo moved to the Albanian-Yugoslav border near Lake Ohrid, crossed the border and took Ohrid in Macedonia. From 9 April the division was in Prrenjas.

Greece 
In June 1941 the division transferred to Larissa in Thessaly, Greece to suppress the growing Greek Resistance. During its time in Thessaly the Pinerolo murdered Greek civilians in the Domenikon massacre. In November 1941 the regimental depot of the 50th Infantry Regiment "Parma" of the 49th Infantry Division "Parma" raised the 313th Infantry Regiment "Pinerolo" in Macerata. The 313th Infantry Regiment joined the Pinerolo in Greece in March 1942. While the Pinerolo was on occupation duty in Greece the depot of the 14th Infantry Regiment "Pinerolo" raised on 1 January 1942 the 235th Infantry Regiment "Piceno" for the 152nd Infantry Division "Piceno".

The division continued on anti-partisan duty until the Armistice of Cassibile was announced on 8 September 1943. In the confusion after the armistice the division was the only Italian division in continental Greece to refuse German demands to surrender. While the 29th Infantry Division "Piemonte", 36th Infantry Division "Forlì", 37th Infantry Division "Modena", 56th Infantry Division "Casale", and 59th Infantry Division "Cagliari" surrendered to the inferior German forces the Pinerolo defended Larissa against German attacks. On 15 September the division moved into the Pindus mountain range, where the commander of the division Adolfo Infante struck with the mediation of a British military mission a collaboration agreement with the Greek People's Liberation Army (ELAS). However, by October the ELAS forced the troops of the Pinerolo to surrender its supplies and weapons, and used the Italian soldiers as forced labor for the rest of the war. The remnants of the division were repatriated to Italy in March 1945.

On 15 April 1952 the Italian Army raised the Infantry Division "Pinerolo" anew. On 1 September 1962 the division was reduced to brigade and it has been active as such since then as Mechanized Brigade "Pinerolo").

Organization

Second Italo-Abyssinian War 1935 
 24th Infantry Division "Gran Sasso"
 13th Infantry Regiment "Pinerolo"
 14th Infantry Regiment "Pinerolo"
 225th Infantry Regiment "Arezzo"
 18th Artillery Regiment "Gran Sasso"
 524th Machine Gun Battalion
 24th Replacements Battalion
 24th Engineer Company

Royal Italian Army divisions in the Ethiopian Campaign had a Pack-Mules unit of 3,000 mules and three regimental truck units with 20 light trucks each.

World War II 1940 

  24th Infantry Division "Pinerolo", in Chieti
 13th Infantry Regiment "Pinerolo", in L'Aquila
 Command Company
 3x Fusilier battalions
 Support Weapons Company (65/17 infantry support guns)
 Mortar Company (81mm Mod. 35 mortars)
 14th Infantry Regiment "Pinerolo", in Chieti
 Command Company
 3x Fusilier battalions
 Support Weapons Company (65/17 infantry support guns)
 Mortar Company (81mm Mod. 35 mortars)
 313th Infantry Regiment "Pinerolo" (raised on 1 November 1941 in Macerata by the depot of the 50th Infantry Regiment "Parma")
 Command Company
 3x Fusilier battalions
 Support Weapons Company (47/32 anti-tank guns)
 Mortar Company (81mm Mod. 35 mortars)
 18th Artillery Regiment "Pinerolo", in L'Aquila
 Command Unit
 I Group (100/17 howitzers)
 II Group (75/27 field guns)
 III Group (75/27 field guns)
 324th Anti-aircraft battery (20/65 Mod. 35 anti-aircraft guns)
 Ammunition and Supply Unit
 XXIV Mortar Battalion (81mm Mod. 35 mortars)
 24th Anti-tank Company (47/32 anti-tank guns)
 24th Telegraph and Radio Operators Company
 61st Engineer Company
 32nd Medical Section
 456th Field Hospital
 457th Field Hospital
 1x Field Hospital
 1x Surgical unit
 24th Truck Section
 82nd Transport Section (Fiat 666 , Fiat 626 , Alfa Romeo 800, Fiat 508CM - commander's car)
 132nd Supply Section
 145th Bakers Section
 122nd Carabinieri Section
 123rd Carabinieri Section
 65th Field Post Office

Attached from 10 December 1940 until March 1942:
 136th CC.NN. Legion "Tre Monti"
 CXXX CC.NN. Battalion (remained attached to the division until September 1943)
 CXXXVI CC.NN. Battalion
 136th CC.NN. Machine Gun Company

Military honors 
For its conduct during the Greco-Italian War the President of Italy awarded on 11 September 1959 to the 13th Infantry Regiment "Pinerolo" Italy's highest military honor, the Gold Medal of Military Valour.

  13th Infantry Regiment "Pinerolo" on 11 September 1959

Commanding officers 
The division's commanding officers were:

 Generale di Divisione Angelo Stirpe (1938 - 9 June 1940)
 Generale di Divisione Giuseppe De Stefanis (10 June 1940 - 18 April 1941)
 Generale di Divisione Licurgo Zannini (19 April 1941 - 16 October 1941)
 Generale di Divisione Cesare Benelli (17 October 1941 - 9 July 1943)
 Generale di Divisione Adolfo Infante (10 July 1943 - 1 June 1944)

CROWCASS 
The names of five men attached to the division can be found in the Central Registry of War Criminals and Security Suspects (CROWCASS) set up by the Anglo-American Supreme Headquarters Allied Expeditionary Force in 1945. The names can be found at: Central Registry of War Criminals and Security Suspects from the Kingdom of Italy. In addition to perpetrating the Domenikon massacre, the division also torture Greek prisoners and committed several rapes while stationed in Greece. One member of the division who was involved in these war crimes, Giovanni Ravalli, was convicted after the war's end though subsequently pardoned.

References 

 

Infantry divisions of Italy in World War II
Greek People's Liberation Army
Military units and formations of Italy in Greece in World War II
Divisions of Italy of the Second Italo-Ethiopian War
Military units and formations of Italy in Yugoslavia in World War II
Thessaly in World War II
Military units and formations disestablished in 1962
Military units and formations established in 1939